PyDev is a third-party plug-in for Eclipse. It is an Integrated Development Environment (IDE) used for programming in Python supporting code refactoring, graphical debugging, code analysis among other features.

History 
PyDev was originally created by Aleks Totic in July 2003, but Fabio Zadrozny became the project's main developer in January 2005. In September of that same year, PyDev Extensions was started as a commercial counterpart of PyDev, offering features such as code analysis and remote debugging.

In July 2008, Aptana acquired PyDev, retaining Zadrozny as the project head. They open sourced PyDev Extensions in September 2009, and merged it with PyDev.

When Appcelerator acquired Aptana in January 2011, they acquired PyDev by extension. Zadrozny was kept as head of the project. Since then, development of PyDev has accelerated.

In March 2011, PyDev 2.0 was released with TDD actions support, and in April of the following year, version 2.5 was released with Django support. May 2013 saw a major milestone as PyDev raised more than its target in a successful crowd sourcing round to continue development, and version 2.7.5 was released. The campaign also funded Zadrozny's creation of LiClipse, a paid closed source fork of Eclipse which bundles PyDev by default.

PyDev received improvements to type inference and a notable increase in contributions to code base when version 2.8 was released in July 2013. Since then, numerous additional improvements have been made to PyDev and it has gained many positive reviews.

Version 5.4.0 was released on November 30, 2016. The main new feature of this release is support for Python 3.6.

Features 
Below there are some of the features available (version 2.7.5):
 CPython, Jython and IronPython support
 Code completion
 Code completion with auto-import
 Code analysis (with quick-fix for problems found in code analysis—Ctrl+1)
 Debugger
 Django
 Remote Debugger (allows debugging scripts not launched from within Eclipse)
 Debug console (allows interactive probing in suspended mode)
 Interactive console
 Python 2.x and 3.x syntax
 Basic syntax highlighting
 Parser errors
 Outline view
 Tabs or spaces preferences
 Smart indent / dedent
 Comment / uncomment / comment blocks
 Code folding
 Go to definition
 Code coverage
 Mark occurrences
 Pylint integration
 TODO tasks
 Content Assistants (Ctrl+1)
 Assign result to attribute or local
 Surround code with try..catch / finally
 Create docstring
 Move import to global scope
 Keywords presented as auto-completions as you type
 Quick-outline

PyDev extensions 
Until September 2009, two versions of PyDev existed: an open-source version, and a shareware version called PyDev Extensions.  Certain advanced features such as code analysis, quick-fixes, and remote debugging were reserved for the non-free version.  On September 3, 2009, Aptana announced PyDev version 1.5, a combined version of PyDev and PyDev Extensions, all available under the Eclipse Public License.

See also 

 Eclipse
 Comparison of Python integrated development environments
 Komodo Edit
 PyCharm

References

External links 

Eclipse software
Free computer libraries
Free integrated development environments
Free integrated development environments for Python
Python (programming language) development tools